Fuzzy Warbles Volume 6 is the sixth volume in the Fuzzy Warbles series, released in September 2004. The Fuzzy Warbles Series brings together demos, rarities and side projects from XTC founding member Andy Partridge.

Track listing
All songs written by Andy Partridge, except where noted. 
 "The Laugh Track" – 2:46
 "The Stinking Rich Song" – 2:53
 "I Can't Tell What Truth Is Anymore" – 2:47
 "Candle Dance" – 1:57
 "The Tiny Circus of Life" – 3:10
 "The Man Who Sailed Around His Soul" – 2:57
 "In My Hand" – 2:49 (Mark Thomas, Martin "Woody" Wood)
 "Difficult Age" – 3:43
 "Pink Thing" – 3:17
 "Shaking Skin House" – 4:24
 "Bike Ride to the Moon" – 1:30
 "My Love Explodes" – 1:55
 "Omnibus" – 3:13
 "Across the Antheap (Skylarking Demo)" – 2:49
 "Across This Antheap (Oranges & Lemons Demo)" – 5:36
 "Human Alchemy" – 5:58
 "Moonlit Drive" – 3:12
 "Prince of Orange" – 2:54
 "End of the Pier" – 4:14

Personnel
Andy Partridge – instruments and vocals on all tracks

Credits
All songs were recorded at Andy's home except 1 at Chipping Norton Recording Studios where the 'secret' recording engineer was Barry Hammond.
Mastered by Ian Cooper at Metropolis Mastering, London
Sleeve art by Andrew Swainson
Thank you thank you Lone Star, Cherilea, Crescent, Britains, Beton, Airfix, Timpo, Marx and any other figure makers who made sure my childhood was well populated.
Erica for continual cheerleading.
Big thanks to Virgin Records for making this series possible.

Andy Partridge albums
Demo albums
2004 compilation albums